"Bring Night" is a song by Australian singer-songwriter Sia. It was released as the third and final single from her fifth studio album, We Are Born, on 10 September 2010. Although a single, there is no known music video recorded for it. 

The song featured as part of the soundtrack in 2010 FIFA World Cup South Africa, the official 2010 FIFA World Cup video game by EA Sports, which was released in April 2010. The single peaked at number 99 on the ARIA Singles Chart in November 2010.

Composition 
"Bring Night" is a pop rock song driven by a guitar and percussive clicks.
It was written in the key of D minor, with a tempo of 140 beats per minute.
Sia says, "Well, it's a pop and rock song with my favourite electric guitarist, Nick Valensi. I love my 2010 album so much that I can't wait to see the people of viewers on YouTube service app for my famous pop rock song!"

Track listing 

 Digital download

 "Bring Night" – 2:57
 "Clap Your Hands" (Doorly Remix) – 5:26

Credits and personnel
Credits adapted from the liner notes of We Are Born.

 Sia Furler – songwriter, vocals
 Greg Kurstin – songwriter, producer, keyboards, guitar, recording engineer, mixer
 Nick Valensi – guitar
 Sam Dixon – bass
 Felix Bloxsom – drums
 The Kids – additional vocals
 Dave Trumfio – recording engineer, mixer
 Pierre de Reeder – recording engineer
 Spencer Hoqd – assistant engineer
 Eric Litz – assistant engineer
 Brian Gardner – masterer

Charts
"Bring Night" debuted and peaked at number 99 on the ARIA Singles Chart for the week commencing 15 November 2010, before departing the week after.

References 

2010 singles
2010 songs
Sia (musician) songs
Songs written by Greg Kurstin
Songs written by Sia (musician)